Jim Cohn is a poet, poetry activist, and spoken word artist in the United States. He was born in Highland Park, Illinois, in 1953. Early poetics and musical influences include Bob Dylan, the subject of a now lost audiotaped for a class project completed in his senior year at Shaker Heights High School, where he also co-captained the varsity football team. He received a BA from the University of Colorado at Boulder in English (1976) and a Certificate of Poetics (1980) from the Jack Kerouac School of Disembodied Poetics at Naropa University where he was a teaching assistant to Allen Ginsberg. He received his M.S. Ed. in English and Deaf Education from the University of Rochester and the National Technical Institute for the Deaf (NTID) in 1986. For over two decades, he worked in the field of disability services, taking a siddha approach as a model of Disability Services and Studies practice and scholarship. He believed that the social sciences should be redefined thematically within the United States into a form of American Karmic Studies.

Career 
In 1980, Jim Cohn published his first collection of poems, Green Sky. In 1989 Prairie Falcon was published by North Atlantic Books. He would follow up this work with five more books of poetry and two works of poetics nonfiction.

He introduced Allen Ginsberg to Deaf poets at NTID in 1984. In 1986, he published a groundbreaking essay entitled "The New Deaf Poetics: Visible Poetry" in Sign Language Studies (52). In 1987, he coordinated the first National Deaf Poetry Conference, in Rochester, NY. The importance of his role in the history of American Sign Language (ASL) poetics was documented in a 2009 film by Miriam Nathan Lerner entitled The Heart of the Hydrogen Jukebox.

In 1990, he began serving as editor to annual poetry magazine, Napalm Health Spa. In 2009, Napalm Health Spa enjoyed its twentieth year of continuous publication. In 2013, released an anthologic special edition of Napalm Health Spa entitled Long Poem Masterpieces of the Postbeats. His entry was "Treasures For Heaven"   Upon release of NHS13, poet David Cope suggested that Long Poem Masterpieces of the Postbeats is akin to Donald Allen's New American Poetry (Grove Press, 1960) in its scope and variety."

In 1995, Jim began his recording career with The Abolitionists, a North Bay Area band that featured Mooka Rennick and guitarist Steve Kimock. He began a solo recording artist career beginning with Unspoken Words in 1998. From 2006-2008, he worked on homage, a spoken word and music recording made upon the death of his mother. In 2009, he released Impermanence, a double CD compilation.

In 1996, Jim began planning for an online poetry project that would explore Beat Generation influences on the Postbeat Poets. In 1997, Jim founded the on-line Museum of American Poetics. In 1999, MAP became the first online poetry site to be mentioned in the New York Times.

Jim published his first collection of prose that same year, exploring the theoretical parallels between ASL and modernist poetries in a book entitled Sign Mind: Studies in American Sign Language Poetics.

Jim's first video production, the American Poet Greats series, won the Best Multimedia Award from Community Television in Boulder, Colorado for three year in a row (2001-2003). In 2003, Jim produced his first film, a 55 minute profile on the life and poetic contributions of the Jack Kerouac School of Disembodied Poetics co-founder Anne Waldman, entitled Anne Waldman: Makeup on Empty Space.

In a 2011 review of Cohn's Sutras & Bardos: Essays & Interviews on Allen Ginsberg, the Kerouac School, Anne Waldman, The Postbeat Poets & the New Demotics, Beat Studies scholar Jonah Raskin wrote "Perhaps no one in the United States today understands and appreciates the poetic durability and the cultural elasticity of the Beats better than Jim Cohn."

Bibliography 
 Treasures for Heaven: Collected Poems 1976-2021, 2022, Giant Steps Press
 If 45 was 16 & 16 was 45, 2020, Museum of American Poetics Publications (Chapbook)
 Birthday News: A Poemoscope, 2018, Museum of American Poetics Publications
 The Ongoing Saga I Told My Daughter: Expanded Edition, 2016, Museum of American Poetics Publications
 The Groundless Ground, 2014, Museum of American Poetics Publications
 Sutras & Bardos: Essays & Interviews on Allen Ginsberg, The Kerouac School, Anne Waldman, Postbeat Poets & The New Demotics, 2011, Museum of American Poetics Publications
 Mantra Winds, 2010, Museum of American Poetics Publications
 The Ongoing Saga I Told My Daughter (original edition), 2009, Museum of American Poetics Publications
 Quien Sabe Mountain, 2004, Museum of American Poetics Publications
 The Golden Body: Meditations on the Essence of Disability, 2003, Museum of American Poetics Publications
 Sign Mind: Studies in American Sign Language Poetics, 1999, Museum of American Poetics Publications
 The Dance of Yellow Lightning Over The Ridge, 1998, Writers & Books Publications
 Grasslands, 1994, Writers & Books Publications
 Prairie Falcon, 1989, North Atlantic Books
 Green Sky, 1980

 Discography 
 Venerable Madtown Hall 2013, MusEx Records
 Commune 2013, MusEx Records
 Impermanence 2008, MusEx Records
 homage 2007, MusEx Records
 Trashtalking Country 2006, MusEx Records
 Emergency Juke Joint 2002, MusEx Records
 Antenna 2000, MusEx Records
 Unspoken Words 1998, MusEx Records
 Walking Thru Hell Gazing at Flowers 1996, MusEx Records
 The Road'' 1995, MusEx Records

External links 

 Official Site
 Museum of American Poetics
 farfalla press 
 Logos Journal
 Project MUSE
 echo nyc
 Wesley Lake
 Poetry Picks: The Best of 2004
 A review of “Antenna” by Michael Basinski
 A review of "Sign Mind: Studies in American Sign Language Poetics" by Christopher Krentz
 Interview with Rob Geisen, Illiterate Magazine
 Review of Sutras & Bardos: Essays & Interviews on Allen Ginsberg, the Kerouac School, Anne Waldman, The Postbeat Poets & the New Demotics by Jonah Raskin
 The Allen Ginsberg Project

References 

American spoken word poets
American male poets
Living people
People from Highland Park, Illinois
1953 births
University of Colorado alumni
University of Rochester alumni
Writers from Shaker Heights, Ohio